"Million Dollar Riff" is a song by Australian band Skyhooks, released in November 1975 as the lead single from the band's third studio album, Straight in a Gay Gay World. The song peaked at number six in Australia.

The song incorporates riffs from other hit songs, including from the Skyhooks' own "Horror Movie", plus the worldwide hits "Satisfaction", "Smoke on the Water", "Sunshine of Your Love", "Day Tripper", "Gloria", and Chuck Berry's "Johnny B. Goode". It also includes lyrical allusions to Berry's "Little Queenie" ("Meanwhile, I was still..."), and Sam Cooke's "Chain Gang" ("Ooh, Ah. Ooh, Ah").

Track listing
7" single (K-6159)
 Side A "Million Dollar Riff" - 3:51
 Side B "Forging Ahead" - 4:04

Charts

Weekly charts

Year-end charts

References 

1975 singles
Mushroom Records singles
1975 songs
Songs written by Greg Macainsh
Skyhooks (band) songs